Sven Eivindsen Aarrestad (8 October 1850 – 19 January 1942) was a writer, politician, and leader in the Norwegian temperance movement during the 19th century.

Biography
Sven  Aarrestad was born at Varhaug in Rogaland county, Norway. He was the eldest of six siblings born to his parents, farmer Eivind Torkelsen Aarrestad (1820–1902) and  Inger Svensdatter Skretting (1829–1922). When he was four years old, his family moved to Årrestad in the community of Time, where he attended private school. From 1868–1869, he attended the  teachers' college in Egersund. He was a teacher from 1869–73 in Høyland. From 1873–75, he went to the  seminary in Stord.  From 1875–76, he was a teacher in Brevik, from 1876–78 in Tønsberg, and from 1878–91, managed a high school at Sande in Vestfold. He was a farmer in Sande from 1891–1906 and the mayor of Sande from 1899 to 1906.

The work of Asbjørn Kloster had aroused Aarrestad's interest in the temperance movement. In 1877 he published his first book on this topic . He was chairman of the Norwegian temperance movement from 1887–1927. He published more than 100 books and pamphlets, most regarding the use of alcohol. From 1892–94, he represented Jarlsberg and Larvik in the Norwegian Parliament. From 1900–1909, he was a member of the executive committee of the Norwegian Liberal Party. From 1906 to 1908, he was Minister of Agriculture in Michelsen's Cabinet and Jørgen Løvland administration. In 1908, he was appointed County Governor of Nedenes amt.

In 1901, Sven Aarrestad was decorated Knight, First class, and in 1908 Commander of the Royal Norwegian Order of St. Olav. Aarrestad was also the holder of the Grand Cross of the Order of the Dannebrog. His last years were spent on his property Soltuft in Arendal, where he died 1942.

Selected works
 , 1877
 , 1889
 , with Andreas Lavik, 1895
 , 1900
 , 1905
 , 1913
 , 1920
 , 1923
 , 1926
  (1927)
 , 1930
 , 1933
 , 1935
 , 1935

References

Related reading

1850 births
1942 deaths
People from Hå
Liberal Party (Norway) politicians
Norwegian male writers
Norwegian temperance activists
Members of the Storting
County governors of Norway
Ministers of Agriculture and Food of Norway
Grand Crosses of the Order of the Dannebrog